Harald Astrup Salvesen (7 January 1889, in Larvik – 22 January 1972) was a Norwegian medical doctor and internist, a professor at Rikshospitalet in Oslo. His publications were mainly in the field of physiological chemistry. He was married to Sylvia Salvesen.

He was decorated Commander of the Order of St. Olav in 1957.

References

1889 births
1972 deaths
People from Larvik
Norwegian internists